Cedar Butte may refer to:

Cedar Butte Township, Adams County, North Dakota
Cedar Butte Township, Pennington County, South Dakota
Cedar Butte, South Dakota, an unincorporated community in Mellette County
Cedar Butte (Washington)